Mitrofan Ban (Serbian Cyrillic: Митрофан Бан; 15 May 1841 – 30 September 1920) was Bishop of Cetinje, Metropolitan of Montenegro, and exarch of the Serbian Orthodox Church. He was also Archimandrite of the Cetinje monastery. He presided over the Holy Bishopric Synod (1919-1920) that unified the Serbian Orthodox Church in 1920.

Life 

Mitrofan Ban's birth name was Marko Ban, and he was born on May 15, 1841 in the village of Glavati in Grbalj region in the Austrian Empire, to Georgije and Anastasija Ban. He is related to writer Matija Ban of Petrovo Selo. He attended Serbian and Italian primary schools in Vranovići and Kotor. In 1865, he took his monastic vows in the Savina monastery near Herceg Novi. He was ordained a deacon by Bishop Stevan Knežević on 27 June 1865, and a presbyter on 2 October 1866. He became the nastojatelj (Serbian: настојатељ or nastojatelj) of Podlastva monastery in 1867, and of Morača monastery in 1869. From 7 September 1870 he was the hegumen (игуман or iguman) of the latter. Both a nastojatelj and an iguman are the senior monk in a monastery; the difference is so slight they are sometimes considered synonyms.

He participated in the war against the Ottoman Empire from 1876 to 1878, for which Prince Nikola decorated him with the Medal of Obilić. He was ordained a Metropolitan on 18 April 1885 in Saint Petersburg. The ceremony was conducted in Saint Isaac's Cathedral by Metropolitan Isidor of St. Petersburg and other members of the Holy Synod of the Russian Orthodox Church, in the presence of Tsar Alexander III of the Russian Empire. Soon after, on 5 September 1884, the relics of Saint Arsenius (the second Serb archbishop) were ceremonially transferred from the Ždrebaonik monastery in Bjelopavlići to the Kosijerevo monastery.

After 1906, he was a member of the National Assembly of the Kingdom of Montenegro. He stayed in the country during the First World War occupation of the Kingdom by Austria-Hungary, and died on 30 September 1920, not long after the formation of the Kingdom of Serbs, Croats and Slovenes, and the reunification of the Serbian Orthodox Church, including the Metropolitanate of Montenegro and the Littoral.

Quotes 
During the First World War, when Austria-Hungary occupied the Kingdom of Montenegro, the occupying troops razed the chapel at the peak of Mount Lovćen and exhumed the remains of Petar II Petrović-Njegoš. At that time, Mitrofan Ban said to Governor Weber: "Njegoš was not just the ruler of Montenegro, but also a poet of Serbdom, and that act will mournfully echo in all Serbian lands".

Notes

References 
Александар Стаматовић: Кратка историја Митрополије Црногорско-приморске (Глава IV)
Воштаница на гробу митрополита Митрофана

1841 births
1920 deaths
Bishops of Montenegro and the Littoral
People of the Principality of Montenegro
19th-century Eastern Orthodox bishops
20th-century Eastern Orthodox bishops
Archimandrites
Serbs of Montenegro